Guillermo "Pinky" Mordan is Dominican reggaeton producer from Harlem, NY. Pinky started his career with music production. He had a segment on Univision’s Despierta America alongside Wisin y Yandel. In 2019, Pinky fused two massive music genres from the latin world, champeta and reggaeton to create a new genre called Champeton.

On March 18th, 2019, Pinky released No Pienses,  the first song under the champeton genre along aside known Colombian artist, Twister El Rey, and John Lajara. No Pienses was well received in Colombia as it ended up in the top 5 for most played songs in Colombia.

Musical career 
Under his company Mordan Music, Pinky made worked with the duo Eddy y Henry. Eddy y Henry’s music premiered on Music Choice, played on both major New York Radio stations La Mega and La X, with songs with major recording artist Nicky Jam, Fuego and Notch, and landed them their first number one record in many cities in Colombia; “Por ti me muero”. Voler “Eddy” is currently working on his solo project debuting with his single “Young Julio Iglesias” under Mordan Music inc.

Recording artist John Lajara has landed in top 10 Latin Charts in Colombia under Mordan Music with his single “Nadie Como Tu” featuring Jory Boy showing the capabilities of uniting artist from different nationalities and becoming a success in different parts of the world.

Production discography & singles

References 

American people of Dominican Republic descent
American reggaeton musicians
1986 births
Living people
People from Harlem
Musicians from New York City